Susan Irvine (1928–2019)  was an Australian educator, author and rose authority.

Family and education
Susan Irvine (pronounced Ervin) was born in Dalby, Queensland in 1928. She was the second of three daughters of John Moore and Niree Hunter (b. 1897, m. 1923). Her self-supporting mother ran a full-time and wide-ranging business called Arts and Antiques. At the same time her mother was socially and geographically prominent, her house Lynfield overlooking Toowoomba from The Range. Susan, like her sisters, boarded at The Glennie School – down the street from Lynfield – from the age of four till the age of 17 and "absolutely hated" it.

Straight after the Second World War Susan began a music degree in voice and cello at the University of Melbourne, married at 19 a Sydney radiologist ten years older, Peter Tod, and moved to Sydney. To further her husband's training they moved to London (1949–1951), where she had a daughter, Felicity (b. 1950). Peter and Susan returned to Brisbane where a second daughter, Diana, was born (b.1951). Susan commenced a B.A. in medieval German mysticism, German poetry and philosophy at Brisbane university. The family travelled to Germany in 1955 where Susan continued her studies at Heidelberg University but returned to Australia in 1956 without completing a PhD at the University of Heidelberg in Germany due to the serious ill health of her daughter, Diana. Fluent in German, Susan  commenced her teaching career at PLC Orange. A third daughter, Josephine, was born in Brisbane in 1958. Josephine's father was Reginald St Leon OAM (b. 1928), associate professor of German in the University of Sydney, and founder of the multilingual International Grammar School in central Sydney. He later remarried and had a second family.

Career
Mostly as Susan St Leon, Susan taught at the following private schools:
 1956, Presbyterian Ladies' College, Orange, New South Wales.   
 1965–72, Abbotsleigh, Sydney, New South Wales under Betty Archdale as headmistress, Susan managing administration and teaching German 
 1973–83, Lauriston Girls' School, Melbourne, as headmistress.

Susan was the first headmistress of Lauriston appointed by the School Council, implying Lauriston was now a public institution more than a private school. "Elegant, charismatic and vivacious", she presided over Lauriston's response to the enormous professional and material expansion of private education in the Whitlam era. Though overt expression of authority was reduced, she strongly favoured doing "one or two things very well [rather than] eight or nine things badly". Things worth achieving undoubtedly included high standards in mathematics, science and languages. These were soon reflected in public exam results. Music, art and drama were also favoured. Mrs St Leon's example showed marriage and children did not preclude a career.

In 1985 Susan married W. R. M. (Bill) Irvine OAM, who had been chairman of the Lauriston School Council 1977–81. Originally a solicitor at Hedderwick, Fookes and Alston, Bill was chairman of the National Australia Bank 1979–97 and its associated companies in the UK and New Zealand. He was also chairman of Phillip Morris Australia and a director of Burns Philp and Caltex Australia. Bill Irvine makes an early appearance in Susan's Garden of a Thousand Roses as a lawyer friend and visitor to Bleak House who reveals a light touch adjusting Shire planning decisions.

Roses
At Gisborne she held the Alister Clark Rose Collection and the Australian Rose Collection for Ornamental Plants.

In the late 1980s and early 1990s Susan used her social and garden connections to find, save, identify and revive scores of roses by the best-known Australian breeder, Alister Clark. Clark's rose 'Nancy Hayward' for instance was identified by Nancy Hayward herself. Little known roses like 'Restless' were carefully evaluated as garden plants. Her companion in many of these explorations was the Coldstream nurseryman John Nieuwesteeg. They surveyed possible Clark material in gardens at Berwick, Kyneton and at Glenara, Clark's house at Bulla. Riethmuller's 'Carabella' was another rose rescued from obscurity.

From this period date her most influential books, describing her discoveries. A Garden of a Thousand Roses started with "a century-old stone cottage called Bleak House on the windswept plains of Central Victoria and transformed it into a mecca for thousands of rose
lovers". A Hillside of Roses about the design and construction of Erinvale was greeted as "a rose book that reads like a novel." She had become "a leading authority on roses".

By 1992 Irvine had named after her mother 'Niree Hunter', a Rugosa rose she had discovered at Bleak House. In 1994 she received the Australian Rose Award from the National Rose Society of Australia. A Hybrid Gigantea rose called 'Susan Irvine' was introduced in South Australia in 1996. She became a Life Member of Heritage Roses in Australia in 2001.

In 1996 she and her husband moved to Forest Hall at Elizabeth Town in Northern Tasmania where she again established a large garden. It contains many Alister Clark roses. (All her gardens are attached to nineteenth century houses.) The Irvines moved to a much smaller property at Evandale, Tasmania in 2013. Illness obliged them to sell it at the end of 2014. Bill died in September 2017; Susan died on 6 September 2019.

Books
 
 
 
  Design by Alison Forbes.
  A combination of the 1992 and 1994 books.
 
 
 

Fragrant Roses was illustrated with photos by Gary Aitchison. All later books have photos by Simon Griffiths. They lack the vividly eccentric character of the early books laid out for Hyland House by Al Knight using Irvine's own amateur photos.

See also
 Alister Clark
 Alister Clark Memorial Rose Garden

Further reading

References

1928 births
2019 deaths
Australian gardeners
People from Queensland
University of Melbourne alumni
Heidelberg University alumni
Australian expatriates in England
Australian expatriates in Germany
Australian schoolteachers